The 2000 US Open was held between August 28 – September 10, 2000. It was the final Grand Slam event of 2000.

Both Andre Agassi and Serena Williams were unsuccessful in their title defences; Agassi being upset in the second round by Arnaud Clément and Williams losing in the quarter-finals to Lindsay Davenport. Marat Safin won his first US Open title and first of two Grand Slams, defeating Pete Sampras in the final, and Venus Williams defeated Davenport to win the women's title.

Seniors

Men's singles

 Marat Safin defeated  Pete Sampras, 6–4, 6–3, 6–3
• It was Safin's 1st career Grand Slam singles title and his 1st and only title at the US Open. It was Safin's 4th title of the year, and his 5th overall.

Women's singles

 Venus Williams defeated  Lindsay Davenport, 6–4, 7–5
• It was Williams' 2nd career Grand Slam singles title and her 1st title at the US Open. It was Williams' 5th title of the year, and her 14th overall.

Men's doubles

 Lleyton Hewitt /  Max Mirnyi defeated  Ellis Ferreira /  Rick Leach, 6–4, 5–7, 7–6
• It was Hewitt's 1st and only career Grand Slam doubles title.
• It was Mirnyi's 1st career Grand Slam doubles title.

Women's doubles

 Julie Halard-Decugis /  Ai Sugiyama defeated  Cara Black /  Elena Likhovtseva, 6–0, 1–6, 6–1
• It was Halard-Decugis' 1st and only career Grand Slam doubles title.
• It was Sugiyama's 1st career Grand Slam doubles title and her 1st and only title at the US Open.

Mixed doubles

 Arantxa Sánchez Vicario /  Jared Palmer defeated  Anna Kournikova /  Max Mirnyi, 6–4, 6–3
• It was Sánchez Vicario's 4th and last career Grand Slam mixed doubles title and her 1st and only title at the US Open.
• It was Palmer's 2nd and last career Grand Slam mixed doubles title and his 1st and only title at the US Open.

Juniors

Boys' singles
 Andy Roddick defeated  Robby Ginepri, 6–1, 6–3

Girls' singles
 María Emilia Salerni defeated  Tatiana Perebiynis, 6–3, 6–4

Boys' doubles
 Lee Childs /  James Nelson defeated
 Tres Davis /  Robby Ginepri, 6–2, 6–4

Girls' doubles
 Gisela Dulko /  María Emilia Salerni defeated
 Anikó Kapros /  Christina Wheeler, 3–6, 6–2, 6–2

Prize money

Total prize money for the event was $15,011,000.

References

External links
 Archived results at SI.com
 Official US Open website

 
 

 
US Open
2000
US Open
US Open
US Open
US Open